Alexandru Viorel Avram (born 25 April 1991) is a Romanian footballer who plays as a midfielder or forward.

Honours
Dunărea Călărași
Liga II: 2017–18

References

External links
 
 

1991 births
Living people
Sportspeople from Galați
Romanian footballers
Association football midfielders
Liga I players
ASC Oțelul Galați players
Liga II players
FCM Dunărea Galați players
FC Delta Dobrogea Tulcea players
FC Brașov (1936) players
FC Dunărea Călărași players
FC U Craiova 1948 players